She Said is a 2022 American biographical drama film directed by Maria Schrader and written by Rebecca Lenkiewicz, based on the 2019 book of the same title by reporters Jodi Kantor and Megan Twohey. The film stars Carey Mulligan and Zoe Kazan as Twohey and Kantor, respectively, and follows their New York Times investigation that exposed Harvey Weinstein's history of abuse and sexual misconduct against women. Patricia Clarkson, Andre Braugher, Jennifer Ehle, and Samantha Morton co-star, with Ashley Judd appearing as herself.

The book was optioned in 2018, and the film was announced in 2021 as a co-production between Annapurna Pictures and Plan B Entertainment. Filming took place in New York with cinematographer Natasha Braier. During post-production, editing was completed by Hansjörg Weißbrich and the score was composed by Nicholas Britell.

She Said had its world premiere at the 60th New York Film Festival on October 13, 2022, and was released in the United States on November 18, 2022, by Universal Pictures. The film received generally positive reviews from critics, who praised the screenplay and the performances of Kazan and Mulligan. It was also named one of the best films of 2022 by the American Film Institute. However, it was a box office flop, grossing $13 million against a production budget of $32 million. The film was nominated for Best Actress in a Supporting Role for Mulligan and Best Adapted Screenplay for Lenkiewicz at the 76th British Academy Film Awards. It also earned Mulligan a Golden Globe Award nomination and Lenkiewicz a Critics' Choice Award nomination.

Plot
In 2017, New York Times reporter Jodi Kantor receives a tip that actress Rose McGowan was sexually assaulted by Indiewood producer Harvey Weinstein. McGowan initially declines to comment, but later calls Kantor back and describes an encounter in which Weinstein raped her when she was 23. Kantor also speaks with actresses Ashley Judd and Gwyneth Paltrow, who describe their own experiences with Weinstein, but both ask not to be named in the article for fear of career blowback. Frustrated by a lack of progress in her ensuing investigation, Kantor recruits Megan Twohey to help with the piece.

Twohey tracks down a woman who worked as an assistant to Weinstein at Miramax decades ago and disappeared; the woman fearfully declines to speak on the matter due to having signed an NDA. Kantor confronts the former CFO of Miramax about past settlement payouts by Weinstein against his accusers, but he is hesitant to divulge any information about it. Twohey is similarly rejected by the EEOC after requesting more information about these payouts. Twohey speaks to a former member of the district attorney's office about why criminal complaints against Weinstein were dropped so quickly; she learns that Weinstein had social connections with the DA office.

Kantor receives a tip about three former Weinstein assistants who may have been abused: Rowena Chiu, Zelda Perkins, and Laura Madden. Kantor flies out to confront each of them individually; she is unable to meet with Chiu, but Perkins recounts an incident in which Chiu had a breakdown after an encounter with Weinstein. Madden initially declines to speak with Kantor, but changes her mind after a representative of Weinstein reaches out to discourage her from speaking to reporters about her experience.

Weinstein learns of the investigation and sends a lawyer to attempt to appease reporters, but declines to go on the record and denies all wrongdoing. The lawyer acknowledges a number of past financial settlements, but declines to say how many. Kantor receives an anonymous tip to speak with Irwin Reiter, one of Weinstein's former accountants; he shows her an internal memo that circulated at Miramax in 2015 detailing abuse allegations from a former employee.

The Times notifies the Weinstein Company board of the impending article and asks for a statement. Weinstein denies the allegations and pressures the reporters to name their sources, threatening to talk to other publications to discredit the story. Weinstein eventually releases a statement acknowledging that he has caused pain to others in the past and that he is taking a leave of absence from The Weinstein Company. Kantor and Twohey attempt to convince their sources to go on the record; all initially decline, but Judd and Madden later agree to be named in the article, believing it is the right thing to do.

The Times publishes the story on October 5, 2017. After the article's publication, 82 women come forward with their own allegations against Weinstein, leading to workplace and legal reforms. Weinstein is currently serving a 23-year sentence for rape and sexual assault in New York, with additional charges pending elsewhere.

Cast

Production

On October 5, 2017, Jodi Kantor and Megan Twohey from The New York Times revealed substantial allegations of sexual misconduct by Hollywood producer Harvey Weinstein, accusing him of three decades of sexually harassing actresses, female production assistants, temps and other employees at Miramax and The Weinstein Company. The allegations served as a catalyst for the burgeoning #MeToo movement and eventually resulted in Weinstein being sentenced to 23 years of imprisonment.

In 2019, Kantor and Twohey published She Said, a book detailing the different processes they employed to investigate and uncover Weinstein's sexual misconduct. The rights to the book were optioned in 2018 by Annapurna Pictures and Plan B Entertainment. In June 2021, Universal Pictures announced they were developing an adaptation with Zoe Kazan and Carey Mulligan in negotiations to star as Kantor and Twohey. It was also reported Maria Schrader was attached to direct from a screenplay by Rebecca Lenkiewicz, with Brad Pitt, Dede Gardner and Jeremy Kleiner set to produce. 

Schrader and Lenkiewicz said they wanted the film to be less focused on reenactments of Weinstein's abuse and harassment and more about the women who were silenced. Said Lenkeiwicz, "Although there is such darkness in the story...there is a lot of beauty and light in women finding each other."

In July 2021, filming began in New York City with cinematographer Natasha Braier. Filming took place at the Times New York headquarters. By August, Patricia Clarkson, Andre Braugher, Samantha Morton, and Tom Pelphrey were announced as part of the cast. Adam Shapiro was confirmed to star in October 2021.

Pitt's involvement with the film has received scrutiny as he was made aware of Weinstein's behavior in 1996 by his then-girlfriend Gwyneth Paltrow and later by his then-partner Angelina Jolie but continued to work with Weinstein after the fact, and because he was accused of abusing Jolie and their children in 2016.

In August 2022, Weinstein and his attorneys tried to delay his trial from its October 10, 2022 start date by claiming that the film's marketing and publicity would prejudice any Los Angeles jury against him; Los Angeles Superior Court Judge Lisa Lench denied the request.

Music

Release
The film was theatrically released in the United States on November 18, 2022, coinciding with the then on-going Weinstein trial in Los Angeles. It premiered at the 60th New York Film Festival on October 13, 2022, and at the BFI London Film Festival on October 14, 2022. It also screened at the TCL Chinese Theatre during the 2022 AFI Fest on November 4, 2022.

Home media
The film was made available for VOD on December 6, 2022, followed by a Blu-ray and DVD release on January 10, 2023.

Reception

Box office
In the United States and Canada, She Said was released alongside The Menu, and was projected to gross $3–5 million from 2,022 theaters in its opening weekend. The film made $830,000 on its first day, including $160,000 from Thursday night previews. It went on to debut to $2.2 million, finishing sixth.

Deadline Hollywood called the opening total "a flop" and cited the "emotional exhaustion" of audiences, the perception of the film's "anticlimactic existence" since the Weinstein trials were still ongoing, and journalists "[not being] as interesting as they think they are" to the average person. They also noted that the trending lack of interest in awards season and auteur projects by the general public and the competition and overlapping demographics from holdovers Black Panther: Wakanda Forever and The Menu may have also played a role in the underperformance.

The Hollywood Reporter, which listed the film's debut among the worst-ever for a film playing in over 2,000 theaters and also noting audiences may not want to "re-litigate recent and ongoing scandals," said that films about Hollywood don't tend to play well outside Los Angeles and New York City, citing that the film's top 10 grossing theaters were on the coasts.

Critical response

  Audiences polled by CinemaScore gave the film an average grade of "A" on an A+ to F scale, and those at PostTrak gave the film an 89% overall.

Writing for AP News, Jocelyn Noveck described the film as not only "a worthy entry to a film genre that includes Spotlight and of course All the President's Men", but also a testament to "the power of journalism... [and] courage, from the women who suffered sexual harassment or assault at Weinstein's hands and came forward at personal risk — to their careers, reputations or well-being."

Critics praised the film for its sensitivity to sexual assault survivors and its non-sensationalist approach, with Ann Hornaday of The Washington Post, commenting: "Schrader films She Said with a bracing combination of straightforwardness and sensitivity, staging the most prurient details of Weinstein's cases with somber restraint rather than salacious literalism." Kristy Puchko of Mashable wrote: "Sexual assault and harassment are not made a spectacle in She Said, as it was in the Fox News-centered docudrama Bombshell. Instead, the details of the allegations are shared, not shown... Schrader trusts we don't need to see what happened to believe these women's stories."

Rolling Stones David Fear wrote there is "a genuine sense of how deep and how wide all of [Weinstein's] cover-ups went. It's a story about survivors, but also about systematic sexism, systematic abuse, systematic intimidation, systematic despair over anything changing. Only the last part gets partially redressed." Fear also noted the film "doesn't pretend that wrongs have been righted once and for all. It just wants to pay tribute to two people stood up to a Goliath and took him down not with one good shot but a million tiny cuts and a lot of hard work."

Praise was given to Mulligan and Kazan, in addition to the ensemble cast. Kate Erbland of IndieWire wrote: "Megan may be the more outwardly cool, calm, and collected one, but Mulligan — always so good at playing women on the edge — brings obvious conflict to the role", while Justin Chang of NPR wrote: "Kazan emphasizes Kantor's empathy, her skill at building trust and coaxing information out of even the most reluctant sources." Entertainment Weeklys Leah Greenblatt wrote: "The ever-reliable Samantha Morton and Jennifer Ehle bring a tensile fury and vulnerability to two of the film's most memorable accusers, and Patricia Clarkson and Andre Braugher have the built-in gravitas to play Kantor and Twohey's suffer-no-fools editors as they methodically track down the tramautized, the complicit, and the less-than-innocent bystanders who will eventually allow them to publish their bombshell report."

Reviews also noted that the film marks a departure from previous journalism films by centering on the two women who broke the story. Stephanie Zacharek of Time wrote: "Instead of hardworking men in their shirtsleeves running around a newsroom, possibly making the occasional call home to check in on their wives and kids, in She Said we see Twohey... at home on maternity leave, struggling with postpartum depression, and Kantor thanking her preteen daughter for helping to pacify her younger, needier sister. As reporters, they're tireless. As moms, they're tired... That's what gives She Said its believable texture. That and the fact that, regardless of this story's ultimately explosive impact, She Said is simply a story of journalists at work." Peter Bradshaw of The Guardian commented: "I admire the way it takes the macho cliched nonsense out of journalism in movies: these are not boozy guys being adorable and chaotic, but smart, persistent people doggedly doing their job." Others were more mixed about the film's depiction of the journalists' home lives, with Noveck saying "there just isn't time for enough backstory, so [the scenes] feel cursory." Bloomberg News Esther Zuckerman felt the scenes' inclusion made for a narratively disjointed film.

More critical reviews opined the film struggles to bring suspense or a sense of urgency to its story, since the events on which it is based on are public knowledge. Scout Tafoya of RogerEbert.com described it as an "artless Wikipedia entry of an Oscar competitor." Though her review was generally positive, Greenblatt commented: "What the movie does to humanize both these women — and their skittish, often terrified witnesses — feels more fully realized than the procedural bits, which often tend to come off like a broad discourse on How Journalism Works." Puchko wrote: "Where She Said trips up is in its ardent need to play like a prestige biopic, wallowing in the heroes' noble intentions and important contributions to the world but forgetting that these characters should also be exciting to watch." Puchko added "Megan and Jodi [as characters] feel too polished to feel real", and concluded: "In short, She Said is good. But grubbiness could have made it great."

Accolades

References

External links

 
 
 
 
 
 Official screenplay

2022 films
2022 biographical drama films

2020s American films
2020s female buddy films
2020s feminist films
2020s English-language films
American docudrama films
American biographical drama films
Annapurna Pictures films
Films about The New York Times
Films about journalists
Films about rape
Films about sexism
Films about sexual harassment
Films based on non-fiction books
Films scored by Nicholas Britell
Films set in 1992
Films set in the 1990s
Films set in the 2010s
Films set in 2015
Films set in 2016
Films set in 2017
Films set in Ireland
Films set in New York City
Films shot in New York City
Plan B Entertainment films
Universal Pictures films
Works about the Harvey Weinstein sexual abuse allegations
Postpartum depression in film